Elizabeth Lackey (born 2 March 1971), is an Australian actress sometimes credited under the name Lisa Lackey.

Career

Lackey grew up in Orange, New South Wales, and attended Orange High School. Lackey was working as a model before she was cast for the part of "Foxy" Roxy Miller on the Australian soap opera Home and Away in 1992. She left the show in 1995.

In 1997, Lackey appeared in The Pretender, in which she played the role of  Cindy Thomas, a photo model harassed by a stalker. In 2001, Lackey appeared in David Lynch's film Mulholland Dr., in which she played the role of Carol, a singer auditioning with Adam Kesher for the part eventually given to Camilla Rhodes. In 2001 she also had a recurring role on the series Rude Awakening. She also was in New Alcatraz in 2002. She portrayed Janice Parkman on the NBC television series Heroes between 2006 and 2010. In 2006 Lackey played the role of the angel Verchiel on ABC Family's Fallen miniseries. Her other roles include the lead in the TV series Just Cause and a supporting role in the final season of NYPD Blue.

Filmography

Film

Television

External links
 
 HoboTrashcan – One on One with Lisa Lackey

1971 births
Australian film actresses
Australian television actresses
Actresses from Sydney
Living people
People from Orange, New South Wales